Benoît Chabot (13 February 1911 – 20 July 2006) was a Canadian newspaper dealer, sales agent and politician. Chabot served as an independent member of the House of Commons of Canada. Chabot was born in Plaisance, Quebec.

He was first elected at the Kamouraska riding in the 1957 general election. After his only federal term, the 23rd Canadian Parliament, Chabot left federal politics and did not seek re-election in 1958.

References

External links
 

1911 births
2006 deaths
Members of the House of Commons of Canada from Quebec
Independent MPs in the Canadian House of Commons